Vadakkemanna is a place situated in Malappuram district of Kerala, India. It is a suburb of Malappuram.

External links
Kerala Tourism

Malappuram